German submarine U-1063 was a Type VIIC/41 submarine of Nazi Germany's Kriegsmarine during World War II. Her keel was laid down on 17 August 1943 by Germaniawerft in Kiel. She was commissioned on 8 July 1944 with Kapitänleutnant Karl-Heinz Stephan in command.

Design
German Type VIIC/41 submarines were preceded by the heavier Type VIIC submarines. U-1063 had a displacement of  when at the surface and  while submerged. She had two shafts and two  propellers.

U-1063 was fitted with five  torpedo tubes (four fitted at the bow and one at the stern), fourteen torpedoes, one  SK C/35 naval gun, (220 rounds), one  Flak M42 and two  C/30 anti-aircraft guns. The boat had a complement of between forty-four and sixty.

Service history
On her first patrol U-1063 was sunk on 15 April 1945 in the English Channel east of Land's End, south of Bigbury, Devon, in position , by squid depth charges from the British frigate . 29 of the crew were killed, there were 17 survivors.

See also
 Battle of the Atlantic (1939-1945)

References

Bibliography

External links

German Type VIIC/41 submarines
U-boats commissioned in 1944
U-boats sunk in 1945
World War II submarines of Germany
World War II shipwrecks in the English Channel
1944 ships
U-boats sunk by depth charges
Ships built in Kiel
U-boats sunk by British warships
Maritime incidents in April 1945